The Escuela Mier y Pesado is a school in Coyoacán, Mexico City operated by the Fundación Mier y Pesado, IAP. As of 2014 it has over 1,370 students in preschool through high school (preparatoria) levels.

The school building has over 40 classrooms, a library, a 200-person auditorium, five science laboratories, and four workshops. There are also three association football (soccer fields),  yards, seven volleyball courts, and seven basketball courts.

References

External links
 "Escuela Mier y Pesado." Fundación Mier y Pesado, IAP.
 "."Foto de la entrada

Schools in Coyoacán
High schools in Mexico City